James or Jimmy Gibson may refer to:

Science and academia
James J. Gibson (1904–1979), American psychologist
James B. Gibson (astronomer), American astronomer who discovered 2309 Mr. Spock
James Gibson (philosopher), 20th-century British philosophy professor
James Glen Sivewright Gibson (1861–1951), British architect

Politics and the law
Sir James Gibson, 1st Baronet (1849–1912), British Member of Parliament for Edinburgh East 1909–1912
James Gibson (bishop) (1881–1952), Anglican bishop in Canada
James Gibson (Irish politician), 19th century UK MP for Belfast
James Gibson (judge) (1902–1992), New York judge
James Gibson (Missouri politician) (1849–1918), American lawyer, judge and politician
James Gibson (New York state senator) (1816–1897), New York lawyer and politician
James Alexander Gibson (1912–2003), Canadian academic, federal bureaucrat and private secretary to prime minister William Lyon Mackenzie King
James B. Gibson (born 1949), Nevada politician
James K. Gibson (1812–1879), Virginia congressman
James William Gibson (1888–1965), politician in Saskatchewan, Canada

Sport
James Gibson (cricketer) (1888–1960), Scottish cricketer
James Gibson (footballer, born 1989), Scottish footballer (Hamilton Academical)
James Gibson (footballer, born 1889) (1889–1915), Scottish footballer
Jamie Noble (born 1976), American professional wrestler born James Gibson
James Gibson (swimmer) (born 1980), British swimmer
James W. Gibson (1877–1951), chairman of Manchester United F.C., 1931–1951
Jimmy Gibson (footballer, born 1901) (1901–1978), Scottish footballer (Partick Thistle, Aston Villa)
Jimmy Gibson (footballer, born 1980), Scottish footballer (Rangers FC, Clyde FC, Partick Thistle)
Jimmy Gibson (ice hockey) (1896–1964), Canadian ice hockey player (Calgary Tigers, Victoria Cougars)

Other
James Gibson (seaman) (1700–1752), British sea captain, soldier, and merchant
James Gibson (businessman), co-founder and CEO of Big Yellow Group
James Gibson (minister) (1799–1871) Church of Scotland and Free Church minister and church history professor
James Young Gibson (1826–1886), essayist and translator